The 2018 Women's National League, known for sponsorship reasons as the Continental Tyres Women's National League, was the eighth season of the Women's National League, the highest women's association football league in the Republic of Ireland. Limerick W.F.C. competed for the first time. Wexford Youths were the winners.

Teams

Format
Teams play each other three times, either twice at home and once away, or once at home and twice away. Each team plays 21 games, either 10 home and 11 away, or 11 home and 10 away.

Standings

Awards

Monthly awards

Annual awards

References

External links 
 

Women's National League (Ireland) seasons
Ireland
Ireland
Women
1
1